Stapleton Glacier is a glacier about 6 nautical miles (11 km) long flowing east from King Peninsula just north of Morelli Glacier. Named by Advisory Committee on Antarctic Names (US-ACAN) after Jo Anne Stapleton, United States Geological Survey (USGS), Reston, Virginia, geographer and map specialist, participated in Antarctic map production from the 1980s to the present, part of the USGS team that compiled the 1:5,000,000-scale Advanced Very High Resolution Radiometer maps of Antarctica and the 1: 250,000-scale Landsat TM image maps of the Siple Coast area.

See also
 List of glaciers in the Antarctic
 Glaciology

References

 

Glaciers of Ellsworth Land